Sandro Jovanović (born 23 April 2002) is a Slovenian footballer currently playing as a forward for Rudar Velenje.

Career statistics

Club

Notes

References

2002 births
Living people
Slovenian footballers
Association football defenders
Slovenian PrvaLiga players
Slovenian Second League players
NK Rudar Velenje players